The Minister of the Overseas is the official in charge of the Ministry of the Overseas in the Government of the French Republic, responsible for overseeing Overseas France. The office was titled Minister of the Colonies until 1946.

The position is currently held by Jean-François Carenco, who succeeded Élisabeth Borne (as acting minister) on 4 July 2022.

Officeholders

Minister of the Colonies (1894–1946) 
 20 March – 30 May 1894 : Ernest Boulanger
 30 May 1894 – 26 January 1895 : Théophile Delcassé
 26 January –  1 November 1895 : Émile Chautemps
 4 November 1895 – 29 April 1896 : Pierre-Paul Guieysse 
 29 April 1896 – 31 May 1898 : André Lebon
 31 May – 28 June 1898 : Gabriel Hanotaux
 28 June –  1 November 1898 : Georges Trouillot
 1 November 1898 – 22 June 1899 : Florent Guillain
 22 June 1899 –  7 June 1902 : Albert Decrais
 7 June 1902 – 24 January 1905 : Gaston Doumergue
 24 January 1905 – 14 March 1906 : Étienne Clémentel
 14 March – 25 October 1906 : Georges Leygues
 25 October 1906 – 24 July 1909 : Raphaël Milliès-Lacroix
 24 July 1909 – 3 November 1910 : Georges Trouillot
 3 November 1910 – 2 March 1911 : Jean Morel
 2 March – 27 June 1911 : Adolphe Messimy
 27 June 1911 – 12 January 1913 : Albert François Lebrun
 12–21 January 1913 : René Besnard
 21 January – 9 December 1913 : Jean Morel
 9 December 1913 – 9 June 1914 : Albert François Lebrun
 9–13 June 1914 : Maurice Maunoury
 13 June – 26 August 1914 : Maurice Raynaud
 26 August 1914 – 20 March 1917 : Gaston Doumergue
 20 March – 12 September 1917 : André Maginot
 12 September – 16 November 1917 : René Besnard
 16 November 1917 – 20 January 1920 : Henry Simon
 20 January 1920 – 29 March 1924 : Albert Sarraut
 29 March – 14 June 1924 : Jean Fabry
 14 June 1924 – 17 April 1925 : Édouard Daladier
 17 April – 29 October 1925 : André Hesse
 29 October 1925 – 19 July 1926 : Léon Perrier
 19–23 July 1926 : Adrien Dariac
 23 July 1926 – 6 November 1928 : Léon Perrier
 11 November 1928 –  3 November 1929 : André Maginot
 3 November 1929 – 21 February 1930 : François Piétri
 21 February – 2 March 1930 : Lucien Lamoureux
 2 March – 13 December 1930 : François Piétri
 13 December 1930 – 27 January 1931 : Théodore Steeg
 27 January 1931 – 20 February 1932 : Paul Reynaud
 20 February – 3 June 1932 : Louis de Chappedelaine
 3 June 1932 – 6 September 1933 : Albert Sarraut
 6 September – 26 October 1933 : Albert Dalimier
 26 October – 26 November 1933 : François Piétri
 26 November 1933 – 9 January 1934 : Albert Dalimier
 9–30 January 1934 : Lucien Lamoureux
 30 January – 9 February 1934 : Henry de Jouvenel
 9 February – 13 October 1934 : Pierre Laval
 13 October 1934 – 24 January 1936 : Louis Rollin
 24 January – 4 June 1936 : Jacques Stern
 4 June 1936 – 18 January 1938 : Marius Moutet
 18 January – 13 March 1938 : Théodore Steeg
 13 March – 10 April 1938 : Marius Moutet
 10 April 1938 – 18 May 1940 : Georges Mandel
 18 May – 16 June 1940 : Louis Rollin
 16 June – 12 July 1940 : Albert Rivière
 12 July –  6 September 1940 : Henry Lémery
 6 September 1940 – 18 April 1942 : Charles Platon
 24 September 1941 – 28 July 1942 : René Pleven (Commissaire)
 18 April 1942 – 26 March 1943 : Jules Brévié
 28 July – 17 October 1942 : Hervé Alphand (Commissaire)
 17 October 1942 – 10 September 1944 : René Pleven (Commissaire)
 26 March 1943 – 20 August 1944 : Henri Bléhaut
 10 September – 16 November 1944 : René Pleven
 16 November 1944 – 21 November 1945 : Paul Giacobbi
 21 November 1945 – 26 January 1946 : Jacques Soustelle

Minister of the Overseas (1946–present) 
 26 January – 23 December 1946 : Marius Moutet
 23 December 1946 – 22 January 1947 : Auguste Laurent
 22 January – 22 October 1947 : Marius Moutet
 22 October 1947 – 29 October 1949 : Paul Coste-Floret
 29 October 1949 – 3 July 1950 : Jean Letourneau
 3–12 July 1950 : Paul Coste-Floret
 12 July 1950 – 11 August 1951 : François Mitterrand
 11 August 1951 – 8 March 1952 : Louis Jacquinot
 8 March 1952 – 8 January 1953 : Pierre Pflimlin
 8 January 1953 – 19 June 1954 : Louis Jacquinot
 19 June 1954 – 20 January 1955 : Robert Buron
 20 January – 23 February 1955 : Jean-Jacques Juglas
 23 February 1955 – 1 February 1956 : Pierre-Henri Teitgen
 1 February 1956 – 13 June 1957 : Gaston Defferre
 13 June 1957 – 14 May 1958 : Gérard Jaquet
 14 May – 9 June 1958 : André Colin
 9 June 1958 – 8 January 1959 : Bernard Cornut-Gentille
 5 February 1960 – 24 August 1961 : Robert Lecourt
 24 August 1961 – 8 January 1966 : Louis Jacquinot
 8 January 1966 – 30 May 1968 : Pierre Billotte
 30 May – 10 July 1968 : Joël Le Theule
 25 February 1971 – 7 July 1972 : Pierre Messmer
 2 April 1973 – 27 February 1974 : Bernard Stasi
 20 March 1986 – 10 May 1988 : Bernard Pons
 23 June 1988 – 29 March 1993 : Louis Le Pensec
 29 March 1993 – 18 May 1995 : Dominique Perben
 18 May – 7 November 1995 : Jean-Jacques de Peretti
 7 May 2002 – 2 June 2005 : Brigitte Girardin
 2 June 2005 – 26 March 2007 : François Baroin
 26 March – 19 June 2007 : Hervé Mariton
 19 June 2007 – 23 June 2009: Michèle Alliot-Marie
 23 June – 6 November 2009: Brice Hortefeux
 6 November 2009 – 10 May 2012: Marie-Luce Penchard
 16 May 2012 – 2 April 2014: Victorin Lurel
 2 April 2014 – 30 August 2016: George Pau-Langevin
 30 August 2016 – 10 May 2017: Ericka Bareigts 
 17 May 2017 – 6 July 2020: Annick Girardin
 6 July 2020 – 20 May 2022: Sébastien Lecornu
 20 May 2022 – 25 June 2022: Yaël Braun-Pivet
 25 June 2022  –  4 July 2022: Elisabeth Borne (acting)
 4 July 2022 – Present: Jean-François Carenco

See also
 Archives nationales d'outre-mer, Aix-en-Provence

References

Further reading 
Robert Aldrich. Greater France: A History of French Overseas Expansion. Macmillan (1996)  pp109–114

External links 
Rulers: France. Ministries, political parties, etc. from 1870: Overseas Ministers (Colonies), Rulers.org
Les Ministres de l'Outre-Mer sous la Vème République. Ministère de l'Outre-Mer outre-mer.gouv.fr.
L'administration centrale du Ministère de l'Outre-Mer: Ministère de l'Outre-Mer outre-mer.gouv.fr.
L'histoire du Ministère de l'Outre-Mer Ministère de l'Outre-Mer outre-mer.gouv.fr.

Former French colonies
Overseas

France
overseas